Evolution is the third album by Latin Rock band Malo, released in 1973. The album has been reissued on CD in 2001 as one of the discs in Rhino Handmade's Celebración box set, with the addition of single edits of I Don't Know and Merengue.

Track listing 

 "Moving Away" (Ron Smith/James Cicero) - 7:17 
 "I Don't Know" (Sonny Henry) - 6:04 
 "Merengue" (Francisco Aquabella/Arcelio Garcia, Jr.)  - 7:03 
 "All For You" (Ron DeMasi/Jorge Santana/Pablo Tellez) - 4:04 
 "Dance to My Mambo" (Forrest Buchtel /Arcelio Garcia, Jr.)  - 4:40 
 "Entrance to Paradise" (Pablo Tellez /Ismael Versoza) - 5:09 
"Street Man" (Pablo Tellez /Arcelio Garcia, Jr./Ron DeMasi) - 5:05

Personnel 
Arcelio Garcia - vocals, percussion
Pablo Tellez - bass, vocals
Francisco Aquabella - bongos, congas, timbales, percussion, vocals
Ron DeMasi - electric piano, organ, clavinet, vocals
Tony Smith - drums, vocals
Jorge Santana - guitar
Carlos Federico - piano (on track 3)
Al Zulaica - piano (on track 5)
Steve Sherard - trombone, vocals
Forrest Buchtel - trumpet
Ron Smith - trumpet

Credits
Recorded at Wally Heider Studio, San Francisco, and Funky Features, San Francisco.

Charts

References

External links
Discogs

1973 albums
Malo albums
Warner Records albums